Mohamed Al-Kaabi (born 11 November 1957) is a Qatari windsurfer. He competed in the 1988 Summer Olympics.

References

1957 births
Living people
Sailors at the 1988 Summer Olympics – Division II
Olympic sailors of Qatar
Qatari male sailors (sport)
Qatari windsurfers